Bertil Elmstedt (born 2 May 1937) is a Swedish former footballer who played his entire career at Malmö FF as a midfielder.

References

External links

1937 births
Association football midfielders
Swedish footballers
Allsvenskan players
Malmö FF players
Living people
Sweden international footballers